Tabernacle Methodist Protestant Church and Cemetery is a historic Methodist church building and cemetery and national historic district located at 5601 Liberty Road in Greensboro, Guilford County, North Carolina. The church was built in 1891, and is a one-story, frame building with a gable roof topped by a belfry. It features Gothic Revival style design elements. The associated cemetery was established about 1822. The parish is now known as Tabernacle United Methodist Church, with its new sanctuary being built in 1994.

It was listed on the National Register of Historic Places in 1995.

See also 

Tabernacle (Methodist)

References

External links
Tabernacle United Methodist Church

Churches in Greensboro, North Carolina
Methodist churches in North Carolina
Cemeteries in North Carolina
Churches on the National Register of Historic Places in North Carolina
Carpenter Gothic church buildings in North Carolina
1822 establishments in North Carolina
Churches completed in 1891
19th-century Methodist church buildings in the United States
Methodist cemeteries
National Register of Historic Places in Guilford County, North Carolina
Historic districts on the National Register of Historic Places in North Carolina